Dereliction of duty is a specific offense under United States Code Title 10, Section 892, Article 92 and applies to all branches of the US military. A service member who is derelict has willfully refused to perform his duties (or follow a given order) or has incapacitated himself in such a way that he cannot perform his duties. Such incapacitation includes the person falling asleep while on duty requiring wakefulness, his getting drunk or otherwise intoxicated and consequently being unable to perform his duties, shooting himself and thus being unable to perform any duty, or his vacating his post contrary to regulations.

Details 
In the U.S. Uniform Code of Military Justice (UCMJ), dereliction of duty is addressed within the regulations governing the failure to obey an order or regulation.

Punishment can include sanctions up to and including the death penalty (in times of war). Outside of wartime, the maximum punishment allowed is a Dishonorable discharge, forfeiture of all pay and allowances, and confinement for 1 year (10 years for service members receiving special pay under 37 USC 310).

Proving dereliction 
In order to prosecute a service member under Article 92, the government must prove beyond a reasonable doubt that the service member knew (or should have reasonably known) his duties and that he was either, through neglect or culpable inefficiency (i.e., being inefficient without just cause), derelict in the performance of those duties.

A duty is imposed in any one of the following ways:

 via a treaty,
 statute,
 regulation,
 lawful order,
 standard operating procedure, or
 custom of the service

That the service member possessed actual knowledge of his duties may be proved via:
 regulations,
 training / operating manuals,
 academic literature,
 testimony of service members who held similar positions,
 customs of the service

Sentinel / lookout 
UCMJ Article 113 ("Misbehavior of sentinel") includes components of behavior that are, in themselves, examples of dereliction of duty:

 Drunk while on post
 Sleeping while on post
 Leaving one's post without being properly relieved

Examples: non-judicial punishment

Failure to follow instructions and directives 
Both a Staff Sergeant and an Airman First Class stationed at Seymour Johnson Air Force Base had their pay reduced by $300 and $200 pay per month, respectively, for two months, when their actions resulted in a delayed launch and subsequent aircraft shutdown. They were found guilty of failing to follow Air Force Instruction 21-101, Air Force Policy Directive 31-3, and Technical Order 00-20-1. They were also given 14 days extra duty and had a reprimand inserted into their files.

Misuse of government property 
An Airman First Class stationed at Seymour Johnson Air Force Base was reduced to Airman when she received non-judicial punishment for dereliction of duty. She was found to have charged over $700 on her Travel Card for personal uses.

Example: court-martial

United States v. Allen Lawson 33 M.J. 946 
In August 1988, Marine Lance Corporal Jason Rother died on a desert exercise at Twentynine Palms, California. First Lieutenant Allen Lawson was charged and convicted of dereliction of duty for disobeying orders (to submit a roster of posted Marines and locations to his superior officer, Captain Edwards) and for failing to post two subordinates as a pair (as ordered by the battalion commander, Lieutenant Colonel Robeson).

References 

Military law